William Bedford Van Lare CMG (1904-1969) was a Ghanaian jurist and diplomat; he was justice of the Supreme Court of Ghana in the first republic and Ghana's High Commissioner to Canada in the NLC regime.

Early life and education
William was born in 1904 at Kpong in the Volta Region to William Ludwig Van Lare, Esq. (A merchant) and Wilhemina Fiawonu Van Lare (née Amegashie) both of Keta.
He had his early education at Bremen Mission School, Keta and his secondary education at Mfantsipim School, Cape Coast. He obtained his bachelor of Laws degree from the University College, London a constituent college of the University of London and continued his studies at Lincoln's Inn, London for his Barrister-at-Law certificate.

Career
He taught at Mfantsipim School and Government schools in Accra and Obo before his law studies abroad. He was called to the bar in 1937 and worked in chambers with his friend Kofi Adumua Bossman who also became a Supreme Court Judge. In 1943, he was appointed magistrate, working in Cape Coast, Accra and Kumasi. He acted as Chief Registrar of the West African Court of Appeal in 1948 and 1950. In 1952, he was puisne judge in the superior bench and in 1957 he became an Appeal Court Judge and Supreme Judge that same year. He resigned in 1963 when the Supreme Court acquitted Tawia Adamafio and others on treason charges in December 1963. He was a foundation fellow of the Ghana Academy of Arts and Sciences in 1959 he served as treasurer for the academy.

In 1966 he was appointed Ghana's High Commissioner to Canada by the NLC government.

Honours
The title of Companion of the Order of St. Michael and St. George (C.M.G.) was conferred upon him by Her Majesty Queen Elizabeth II.

He was honoured by the Government of Lebanon with the title; Commander of the National Order of the Cedar.
In 1967 he was given the Grand Medal of Ghana by the Ghana government.

Family
He is the grandson of Charles Leone Van Lare, Esq., of Accra and the great grandson of Mantse Nii Akrashie I of James Town, Accra. He was married to Mrs. Alice Van Lare, together they had four children.

Death
He died on 3 September 1969 in Accra after a short illness. He was given a state burial with full honours by the order of the then government; the National Liberation Council.

See also
 List of judges of the Supreme Court of Ghana
 Supreme Court of Ghana
 1960 Birthday Honours

References

1904 births
1969 deaths
Mfantsipim School alumni
20th-century Ghanaian judges
Alumni of the University of London
Justices of the Supreme Court of Ghana
Knights Commander of the Order of St Michael and St George
Fellows of the Ghana Academy of Arts and Sciences